Lieutenant General Alexander Duroure ( – 1 February 1765) was a British Army officer who served as colonel of the 4th (King's Own) Regiment of Foot.

He was of Huguenot extraction, the son of Francis Du Roure, a French immigrant who had served in Ireland, and his wife Catherine Rieutort and was the brother of Colonel Scipio Duroure.

Duroure was commissioned as a lieutenant in the 10th Regiment of Foot in 1715. He took part in the first attack on Cartagena de Indias in March 1740 during the War of Jenkins' Ear and was deployed with a contingent of 500 men to assist James Oglethorpe in securing the Carolinas in 1742. He became Quartermaster General to Field Marshal George Wade at Newcastle upon Tyne in 1745 during the Jacobite rising and Governor of St Mawes Castle later that year. He was deployed to Scotland with reinforcements in 1746 and commanded the 38th Regiment of Foot in Antigua in 1752. He was also colonel of the 4th (King's Own) Regiment of Foot (1756–65).

He died in France in 1765 and was buried in Westminster Abbey, where his memorial reads "Alexander Duroure Esqr. Lieutenant General of the British forces, Colonel of the Fourth or Kings Own Regiment of Foot and Captain or Keeper of His Majesty's Castle of St Maws in Cornwall who after 57 years faithful service died at Toulouse in France on the 2nd day of January 1765 aged 73 years, and lies interred in this cloyster." He had married Louisa Bruchell but had no children.

References

External links
 findagrave.com memorial record

|-

1692 births
1765 deaths
British Army lieutenant generals
Burials at Westminster Abbey
English people of French descent
British Army personnel of the Jacobite rising of 1745
British Army personnel of the War of the Austrian Succession
South Staffordshire Regiment officers
Royal Lincolnshire Regiment officers
King's Own Royal Regiment officers
Military personnel from London